John Charles Wester, (born November 5, 1950) is an American prelate of the Roman Catholic Church who has been serving as archbishop of the Archdiocese of Santa Fe in New Mexico since 2015. He previously served as bishop of the Diocese of Salt Lake City in Utah from 2007 to 2015 and as an auxiliary bishop of the Archdiocese of San Francisco in California from 1998 to 2007.

Early life and education

John Wester was born in San Francisco, California, on November 5, 1950, the fourth generation of his family born there. Wester attended Our Lady of Mercy Parish School in Daly City, California. Wester graduated from St. Joseph's College Seminary, Mountain View, California, in 1972, and then attended St. Patrick Seminary in Menlo Park, California, where he earned a Master of Divinity degree in 1976. Wester received a Master of Applied Science degree from the University of San Francisco in 1984, and then a Master of Spiritual Theology degree from Holy Names College in Oakland, California in 1993.

Early career
Wester was ordained a priest by Archbishop Joseph McGucken for the Archdiocese of San Francisco on May 15, 1976. After his ordination, Wester was appointed associate pastor at Saint Raphael Parish in San Rafael, California. In 1979, he became a teacher and director of campus ministry at Marin Catholic High School in Kentfield, California. Wester later became president of the high school and eventually assistant superintendent for high schools for the archdiocese. In 1988, he was named as assistant to the archbishop. Wester's first appointment as pastor was at Saint Stephen Parish in San Francisco in 1993. Wester returned to the Pastoral Center in 1997 to become the vicar for clergy, where he was named a monsignor by the Vatican.

Auxiliary Bishop of San Francisco

On June 30, 1998, Pope John Paul II appointed Wester as titular bishop of Lamiggiga and as an auxiliary bishop for the Archdiocese of San Francisco. He received his episcopal consecration from Cardinal William Levada on September 18, 1998. Wester then served as moderator of the curia until 2003. While he was episcopal vicar for clergy, Wester also served as vicar general of the archdiocese. He also served as apostolic administrator from August 2005 to February 2006. Wester was heavily involved in sexual abuse cases in the archdiocese, meeting with victims and accused clergy.

Bishop of Salt Lake City

Pope Benedict XVI appointed Wester as bishop of the Diocese of Salt Lake City on January 8, 2007. He was installed there on March 14, 2007.

Bishop of Santa Fe 
On April 27, 2015, Pope Francis appointed Wester as archbishop for the  Diocese of Santa Fe. He was installed there on June 4, 2015.

Since his consecration, Wester has been involved with the US Conference of Catholic Bishops (USCCB) as a member of the Bishops Committee on Vocations, chairman of Northern California Ch'an/Zen-Catholic Dialogue, consultant for the Subcommittee on Interreligious Dialogue, member of the Migration Committee, the Pastoral Practices Committee, World Mission Committee, the Subcommittee on Lay Ministry, and as the USCCB bishop-liaison to Asia.

See also

 Catholic Church hierarchy
 Catholic Church in the United States
 Historical list of the Catholic bishops of the United States
 List of Catholic bishops of the United States
 Lists of patriarchs, archbishops, and bishops

References

External links
 Roman Catholic Archdiocese of Santa Fe Official Site
 USCCB Bishop Listing
 Catholic Professional and Business Club Biography of Wester
 Announcement of Wester becoming Auxiliary Bishop
 Diocese of Salt Lake City announcement of Wester becoming Bishop
 Diocese of Salt Lake City Biography of Wester

 

1950 births
Living people
People from San Mateo County, California
University of San Francisco alumni
Holy Names University alumni
People from San Rafael, California
Roman Catholic bishops of Salt Lake City
21st-century Roman Catholic archbishops in the United States
Roman Catholic archbishops of Santa Fe
Catholics from California